Royal Air Force Fauld is a former Royal Air Force underground munitions storage depot located  south west of Tutbury, Staffordshire and  north east of Rugeley, Staffordshire, England.

The site was controlled by No. 21 Maintenance Unit RAF which stored munitions underground.

The explosion 

At 11:11 am on Monday, 27 November 1944 an explosion destroyed a large part of the site and killed about 70 people.

Post 1944 
The depot was used until 1966 when the site was closed. However, in late 1966 when France withdrew from NATO's integrated military structure the site was briefly used between 1967 and 1973.

See also
List of former Royal Air Force stations

References

External links

Fionn's Websites - Coal Mining and Mines Rescue - The day the world blew up

Royal Air Force stations of World War II in the United Kingdom
Royal Air Force stations in Staffordshire
Ammunition dumps of the United Kingdom
Military installations closed in 1966